The 2002 Ordina Open was a tennis tournament played on grass courts in Rosmalen, 's-Hertogenbosch in the Netherlands that was part of the International Series of the 2002 ATP Tour and of Tier III of the 2002 WTA Tour. The tournament was held from June 17 through June 23, 2002.

Finals

Men's singles

 Sjeng Schalken defeated  Arnaud Clément 3–6, 6–3, 6–2
 It was Schalken's only title of the year and the 13th of his career.

Women's singles

 Eleni Daniilidou defeated  Elena Dementieva 3–6, 6–2, 6–3
 It was Daniilidou's only title of the year and the 1st of her career.

Men's doubles

 Martin Damm /  Cyril Suk defeated  Paul Haarhuis /  Brian MacPhie 7–6(8–6), 6–7(6–8), 6–4
 It was Damm's 3rd title of the year and the 23rd of his career. It was Suk's 3rd title of the year and the 25th of his career.

Women's doubles

 Catherine Barclay /  Martina Müller defeated  Bianka Lamade /  Magdalena Maleeva 6–4, 7–5
 It was Barclay's 2nd title of the year and the 2nd of her career. It was Müller's 2nd title of the year and the 2nd of her career.

External links
 
 ATP tournament profile
 WTA tournament profile

Ordina Open
Ordina Open
Rosmalen Grass Court Championships
2002 in Dutch tennis